Keiunta Denard Span (born February 27, 1984) is an American former professional baseball center fielder. He played in Major League Baseball (MLB) for the Minnesota Twins, Washington Nationals, San Francisco Giants, Tampa Bay Rays and Seattle Mariners.

Span batted and threw left-handed and at the height of his career was known as one of the premier leadoff hitters in baseball due to his exceptional on-base percentage.

Early life
Span was raised by his single mother, Wanda Wilson, in Tampa. Wilson, a Federal City College graduate, supported Span and his brother, Ray, by working variously as a claims adjuster and day care operator. Their father had very little presence in their lives.

As a teenager, he attended Tampa Bay Devil Rays games at Tropicana Field. He attended Tampa Catholic High School where he played football and baseball. Span won a state baseball championship with Tampa Catholic as a junior in 2001. As a senior, he hit .490. He committed to play college baseball at Florida. According to Baseball America, he could have played college football as a wide receiver if he had not focused on baseball.

Professional career
Span was selected by the Twins with the 20th overall pick 2002 Major League Baseball draft from Tampa Catholic. Span turned down just over $2 million from the Colorado Rockies in a predraft deal (who instead drafted Jeff Francis with the eighth pick) and his fall to the 20th pick cost him around $800,000. Following his selection, Span signed with the Twins on August 15, 2002 which caused him to miss all of the 2002 minor league season.

He started his minor league career in 2003 at Elizabethton, the Twins rookie-league affiliate. In 2004, Span was promoted first to the Gulf Coast League Twins in Fort Myers, Florida and, after only appearing in 5 games, for the Quad Cities of the Low Single A Midwest League. In 2005, he was promoted to Fort Myers Miracle, the Twins Advanced A affiliate, and then to the New Britain Rock Cats, the Twins Double-A affiliate. In 2006, Span returned to the Rock Cats, but was promoted Triple-A Rochester Red Wings in 2007.

Minnesota Twins

Throughout the 2008 spring training, Span was competing with Carlos Gómez to be the Twins' starting center fielder, but ultimately lost out to Gomez and was outrighted to AAA. However, on April 6, Michael Cuddyer was placed on the 15-day disabled list and Span was called up to make his Major League debut against the Kansas City Royals. Span failed to impress the Twins (hitting .258/.324/.258) and was sent back down to AAA. However, he got hot over the next 40 games in AAA (.340/.434/.481) and was recalled to the Twins where he spent the rest of 2008 season. Span's 2008 season totals were .294/.387/.432 with 6 home runs, 47 RBI, and 7 triples in 93 games. Span was chosen to play in the 2008 Beijing Olympics but because he had been promoted, he was forced to skip the Olympics.

In 2009, Span got the nod to start as a left fielder. He also played center field and right field throughout the season. His 2009 stats showed some improvement from 2008, hitting .311/.392/.415 with 8 home runs, 68 RBI, and 10 triples in 145 games. He also stole bases 23 times while getting caught 10 times. Span earned the odd distinction of becoming the player to hit both the first regular and post season hits at Yankee Stadium in 2009.

On March 13, 2010, Span made public a five-year deal worth $16.5 million with the Minnesota Twins that included an option for the 2015 season worth $9 million with a $500,000 buyout. This contract effectively bought out all of Span's arbitration years but did not go beyond his available free agency. On March 31, he unintentionally hit his mother, who was sitting in the stands, with a foul ball. On April 2, Span collected the first hit (a triple) and the first home run in the Twins' new ballpark Target Field in an exhibition game against the St. Louis Cardinals.

On June 29, Span tied the modern-day Major League Baseball record by hitting three triples in one game against the Detroit Tigers in an 11-4 victory. He became the 29th player since 1900 to accomplish this feat, the second Minnesota Twin (after Ken Landreaux in 1980), and the first player since Rafael Furcal performed the feat on April 21, 2002. His night also included a single and five runs batted in.

Overall, Span hit .284/.357/.389 in his Minnesota career, with 254 walks and 321 strikeouts in 2354 at-bats and stole 90 bases in 118 attempts. Adding his strong defense gives him an overall wins above replacement of 15.9. He also became the first ever player on the 7-Day Disabled List in 2012.

Washington Nationals

After being tied with the Nationals in trade rumors as far back as 2011, the Twins finally traded Span to the team on November 29, 2012 for Washington's 2011 first round pick (23rd overall), starting pitcher Alex Meyer. After the trade, Span became the team's starting center fielder, moving 2012 NL Rookie of the Year Bryce Harper to left field. During the 2013 season, Span set a personal and league high with a 29-game hit streak (besting the previous 2013 season high of 27 games set by former Twins teammate Michael Cuddyer). The streak ended on September 19 following an 0-4 performance against the Miami Marlins. During the streak, Span raised his season average from .258 to .281 (46 for 128) while hitting two home runs, recording 9 RBI, and scoring 21 runs. For the season he batted .279/.327/.380 and led the majors with 11 triples. On September 5, 2014, he earned his 1,000 career hit against the Philadelphia Phillies at Nationals Park. He finished the 2014 season hitting .302/.355/.416 and led the National League with 184 hits, which also set the Nationals club record for hits in a single season.

On December 3, 2014, Span underwent a sports hernia surgery. He claimed that he suffered this injury toward the end of the 2014 season but didn't miss any games. Recovery time required 6 weeks, giving him enough time to be ready for 2015 spring training. During March 2015, Span underwent core muscle surgery. He began the 2015 season on the 15-day disabled list and made his season debut on April 19, 2015.

San Francisco Giants
On January 7, 2016, Span signed a three-year, $31 million, contract with the San Francisco Giants that included a mutual option for 2019 and $5 million in performance bonuses. On June 13 at AT&T Park, Span became the first San Francisco Giant to hit a leadoff splash hit home run in the first inning into McCovey Cove and joined the San Diego Padres' Brian Giles as the only two players in the history of the ballpark to accomplish the feat. He batted .268/.330/.402 for San Francisco (2016, 2017 seasons).

Tampa Bay Rays
On December 20, 2017, the Giants traded Span, Christian Arroyo, Matt Krook, and Stephen Woods to the Tampa Bay Rays for Evan Longoria and cash considerations. On March 29, 2018, Span hit a three-run triple on Opening Day 2018 against Carson Smith of the Boston Red Sox to give the Rays a 5-4 lead. He became the third player to triple in his Rays debut. He batted .238/.364/.385 for Tampa Bay.

Seattle Mariners 
On May 25, 2018, the Rays traded Span and reliever Álex Colomé to the Seattle Mariners in exchange for minor leaguers Andrew Moore and Tommy Romero. He hit .272 in 94 games for Seattle, hitting seven home runs. The Mariners declined the 2019 option on his contract, making him a free agent, on October 30, 2018.

On June 8, 2020, Span confirmed that he had played his final game in the major leagues.

Career statistics
In 1359 games over 11 seasons, Span posted a .281 batting average (1498-for-5326) with 773 runs, 265 doubles, 72 triples, 71 home runs, 490 RBIs, 185 stolen bases, 515 bases on balls, .347 on-base percentage and .398 slugging percentage. He finished his career with a .991 fielding percentage playing at all three outfield positions. In 14 postseason games, he hit .258 (17-for-66) with four runs, three doubles, one triple, two RBI, two stolen bases and two walks.

Career after baseball
On January 24, 2021, it was announced that Span was hired by the Tampa Bay Rays as a special assistant in baseball operations. Span joined Bally Sports Sun as an analyst for the Rays in February 2023.

Personal life
Span is a Christian. Span proposed to Anne Schleper, who won a silver medal for ice hockey with the United States in the 2014 Winter Olympics, on December 31, 2016. They married in January 2017 in Naples, Florida. The couple welcomed their first child, a son, in October 2017.

Span founded a non-profit, The Denard Span Foundation, to aid single parent families.

See also

 List of Major League Baseball annual triples leaders

References

External links

1984 births
Living people
Baseball players from Tampa, Florida
Baseball players from Washington, D.C.
African-American baseball players
Major League Baseball center fielders
Minnesota Twins players
Washington Nationals players
San Francisco Giants players
Tampa Bay Rays players
Seattle Mariners players
Elizabethton Twins players
Gulf Coast Twins players
Quad Cities River Bandits players
Fort Myers Miracle players
New Britain Rock Cats players
Rochester Red Wings players
Hagerstown Suns players
Tigres de Aragua players
American expatriate baseball players in Venezuela
Grand Canyon Rafters players
21st-century African-American sportspeople
20th-century African-American people